Cesare Salvi (born 9 June 1948) is an Italian politician who served as minister of labor and social security.

Early life
Salvi was born in Lecce on 9 June 1948.

Career
Salvi was the spokesperson for the secretary of the Democrats of the Left (DS). He was a senator from 1992 to 2008. He was also head of the DS senators.

He served as the relatore (secretary) for one of the four sub-committees (specifically one about the form of government) dealing the future form of the Italian governments under the joint constitutional committee launched during the period of 1997-1998. He was appointed labor minister to the cabinet headed by Prime Minister Giuliano Amato in June 2000. Salvi replaced Antonio Bassolino as labor minister. He was in office until 2001.

Then Salvi served as the head of the judiciary committee at the 14th senate of Italy from 30 May 2001 to 27 April 2006. He became the leader of the DS's left wing, ‘Sinistra per il Socialismo’ (Left for Socialism), in the mid-2000s.

Books
Salvi is the author of the following books: Il contenuto del diritto di proprietà. Artt. 832-833 (1994; The content of the property right. Articles 832 to 833), La rosa rossa: Il futuro della sinistra (Ingrandimenti) (2000; The red rose: The Future of the Left (enlargements)) and La responsabilità civile (2005; Responsibility of Civils). He also published a book about cronyism in 2005, The Cost of Democracy.

References

External links

20th-century Italian writers
21st-century Italian writers
1948 births
Democratic Party of the Left politicians
Democrats of the Left politicians
Italian Ministers of Labour
Italian male writers
Living people
Members of the Senate of the Republic (Italy)
People from Lecce